Weiningen is a municipality in the district of Dietikon in the canton of Zürich in Switzerland. It is located in the Limmat Valley (German: Limmattal).

The municipality was first mentioned in 870 as Winingon.

Geography

Of this area, 32.5% is used for agricultural purposes, while 38% is forested. Of the rest of the land, 28.8% is settled (buildings or roads) and the remainder (0.7%) is non-productive (rivers, glaciers or mountains).  housing and buildings made up 17.2% of the total area, while transportation infrastructure made up the rest (11.5%). Of the total unproductive area, water (streams and lakes) made up 0.2% of the area.  17.2% of the total municipal area was undergoing some type of construction.

Demographics

, 24.1% of the population was made up of foreign nationals.  the gender distribution of the population was 51% male and 49% female. Over the last 10 years the population has grown at a rate of 13.8%. Most of the population speaks German (85.8%), with Italian being second most common (3.9%) and Albanian being third (2.6%).

In the 2007 election the most popular party was the SVP which received 42.7% of the vote. The next three most popular parties were the SPS (15.5%), the FDP (15.1%) and the CSP (9.3%).

The age distribution of the population is children and teenagers (0–19 years old) make up 23.1% of the population, while adults (20–64 years old) make up 65% and seniors (over 64 years old) make up 11.9%. In Weiningen about 76.7% of the population (between age 25-64) have completed either non-mandatory upper secondary education or additional higher education (either university or a Fachhochschule). There are 1623 households in Weiningen.

Weiningen has an unemployment rate of 2.96%. , there were 59 people employed in the primary economic sector and about 19 businesses involved in this sector. 396 people are employed in the secondary sector and there are 40 businesses in this sector. 636 people are employed in the tertiary sector, with 116 businesses in this sector.  44.4% of the working population were employed full-time, and 55.6% were employed part-time.

 there were 1345 Catholics and 1406 Protestants in Weiningen. From the 2000 census, 42.2% were some type of Protestant, with 40.5% belonging to the Swiss Reformed Church and 1.7% belonging to other Protestant churches. 32% of the population were Catholic. Of the rest of the population, 0% were Muslim, 10.7% belonged to another religion (not listed), 3.3% did not give a religion, and 11.1% were atheist or agnostic.

Historic population 
The historic population of the municipality is described by the following graph:

Transport
From 1901 to 1931, Weiningen was served by a branch of the Limmattal tramway with service to Schlieren and connections to Zürich. Today it is served by bus routes 302 and 304, which provide links to Altstetten, Dietikon and Schlieren. The nearest railway stations are Schlieren and Dietikon.

References

External links 

 Official website 

Municipalities of the canton of Zürich